American pop singer and songwriter Jesse McCartney has released five studio albums, twenty two singles, two live albums, three EPs, and two DVDs.

In 1999, McCartney began his music career as the youngest member of boy band Dream Street. They released one album to gold sales in the US, before breaking up in 2002. Two years later, he signed with Hollywood Records and launched as a solo artist with the debut single "Beautiful Soul", which became a worldwide hit. The album of the same name was a platinum seller in the US and Australia. In 2006, McCartney sported a harder rock sound on his second album Right Where You Want Me to less success. In 2008, he released his third album Departure and the album's first single "Leavin'" became his most successful US hit, gaining platinum status. He has also become known for his songwriting, having co-penned the worldwide number one "Bleeding Love" for English singer Leona Lewis.

Albums

Studio albums

Live albums

Video albums

Extended plays

Singles

As lead artist

As featured artist

Other album appearances

Songwriting credits

Music videos

References

External links

Pop music discographies
Discographies of American artists
Discography